Richard Corrigan (born 10 February 1964) is an Irish chef. He is chef/patron of Corrigan's Bar & Restaurant Mayfair, Bentley's Oyster Bar and Grill, Daffodil Mulligan Restaurant & Gibney's Bar London and Virginia Park Lodge in Virginia, County Cavan.

Early life
Richard Corrigan was born and raised in Ballivor, County Meath. He studied at Dublin Institute of Technology.

Career
Having spent several years in the Netherlands, he was then head chef of Mulligan's in Mayfair in London. His first Michelin star was awarded to him when he was head chef of Stephen Bull in Fulham in 1994, also in London.

He opened Lindsay House in Soho, London, and won a Michelin star there in 1997. He then bought and refurbished Bentley's in 2005 and subsequently opened Corrigan's Mayfair in 2008. The latter restaurant has been awarded London Restaurant of the Year by the Evening Standard in 2008 and has earned three AA Rosettes. It was also awarded ‘AA London Restaurant of the Year’ in 2009, and gained one of the highest new entries in the National Restaurant Awards at number five.

He was crowned winner of the Great British Menu three times. Richard also won the Great British Waste Menu special in 2010, airing to over 7 million on BBC 1 prime time and which culminated in a dinner at the House of Lords.

Politics
He is well known in Ireland for his outspoken opinions and he is an occasional contributor to RTÉ Radio 1 discussions on Brexit.

In December 2017 he said of the UK, "Never have I seen a country led so badly in my life - by a bunch of monkeys, frankly. I'd like to have them all at a Christmas party and give them the worst hiding they could imagine."
In June 2018 he said London is "led by a load of donkeys", and of the UK Cabinet "Harrow, Eton and these private schools where most of these absolute monkeys come out of. I'd love to smack their arses with a big cane."

Television

Cookery School (Channel 4)
Chef's Race (BBC America)
Great British Menu (BBC Two)
Great British Food Revival (BBC Two)
Full On Food, Saturday Kitchen (BBC One)
Market Kitchen (UKTV)
 Something For The Weekend (BBC Two)
The Wright Stuff (Channel 5)
Corrigan Knows Food (RTÉ)
The Taste (Channel 4)

Books
 1999:  The Richard Corrigan Cookbook:  From the Waters to the Wild published by Hodder & Stoughton Ltd, ASIN: B001LN4LGY 
 2008:  The Clatter of Forks and Spoons: Honest, Happy Food published by Fourth Estate,  
 2011:  Cookery School: Where anyone can learn to cook published by Penguin Books,

See also

 List of oyster bars

References

Further reading
 Channel 4 article

External links
 
 Corrigan's Mayfair
 Bentley's Oyster Bar and Grill
 Great British Menu
 RTE Corrigan Knows Food web page
 Corrigan's biography on bbc.co.uk

Living people
1964 births
People from County Meath
Alumni of Dublin Institute of Technology
Irish chefs